The Colorado Creek is a river in Uruguay.

It rises in the eastern part of the city Las Piedras. From there it flows, while forming the boundary between Las Piedras and Progreso, initially in a north-westerly direction before its course from the confluence of its right-hand tributary Arroyo Colorado Chico snaps to the southwest. At Paso Don Fabián it passes under Ruta 48 and a few hundred meters downstream also Ruta 36. On its last section from the confluence of the Arroyo de las Piedras, it forms the border of the Departamentos of Canelones and Montevideo, to then flow left into the Santa Lucía River.

References

Rivers of Uruguay
Río de la Plata
Rivers of Montevideo Department
Rivers of Canelones Department